Imperium Romanum is a 2008 city-building video game for Microsoft Windows developed by Haemimont Games and published by Kalypso Media (SouthPeak Games only licensed the game for a U.S. release by Kalypso). Players act as governor of a Roman province and must build and maintain a thriving and prosperous settlement. The game takes place during the time of the Roman Empire. Players build Roman towers, gates, and bridges and use currency to fund projects. The Italian and Spanish versions of the game are titled Imperivm: Civitas II.

Gameplay
Imperium Romanum is a sequel to the 2006 game Glory of the Roman Empire, by the same developer. Imperium Romanum features significantly improved graphics from its predecessor and also adds several large Roman monuments such as the Circus Maximus and the Colosseum. The game does not have a scripted campaign mode like some other city-building games, but instead has the player navigate different historical scenarios such as life in Pompeii under the terror of Mount Vesuvius. Along with maintaining cities, players must also keep them very well-organized and keep money evenly distributed among the people. If the people of the city experience extreme poverty, crime rates may increase, which has a number of negative effects on the city.

The game features fully rendered 3D structures and people and allows the player to zoom in and out of the scene as well as rotate the camera a full 360 degrees. While much of the game is focused on building and maintaining cities, there are some RTS elements when opposing cities and civilizations do battle with the player's. Along with building fortified walls and towers around their cities to prevent enemy attacks, players may also build objects such as trebuchets to go on the offensive against opposing nations.

Expansion pack
An expansion pack entitled Imperium Romanum: Emperor Expansion was released in North America on July 30, 2008, and in Europe on August 29, 2008.

Reception

Imperium Romanum

The game received "mixed" reviews according to the review aggregation website Metacritic. A review in GamesRadar+ praised the game's pace, buildings and user interface, while criticizing its uninspired mechanics and underwhelming design. IGN gave a similarly mixed review.

Emperor Expansion

The Emperor Expansion pack received a "mixed" review based solely on IGN's review according to Metacritic.

References

External links
 
  at Haemimont Games
 
 

2008 video games
City-building games
Real-time strategy video games
Video games set in the Roman Empire
SouthPeak Games
Video game sequels
Video games developed in Bulgaria
Video games with expansion packs
Windows games
Windows-only games
Video games set in antiquity
Multiplayer and single-player video games